Shackled is a 2012 short drama-thriller film directed by Nour Wazzi and starring Emilia Clarke and Hadley Fraser.

Plot
Held captive by a circus in 1950s Louisiana, Malu is frantically rescued from her shackles by her husband. As she waits anxiously in the darkness for her chance to escape, a disturbing truth she's hidden away seeps back into her consciousness.

Cast
 Emilia Clarke as Malu
 Hadley Fraser as Jesse

Reception
One reviewer said of the film, "Although I never really understood what she was running away from the glossy almost fantasy like cinematography kept me watching until the very end."

References

External links
 

2012 films
2012 thriller drama films
British thriller drama films
British drama short films
2012 short films
2012 drama films
2010s English-language films
2010s British films